

State of Origin
This is a list of records in the State of Origin series for New South Wales.

Individual Records

Most Capped (20+ Games)

Most Points (50+ Points)

Most Tries (7+ Tries)

Individual Appearance Records

Individual Scoring Records

Team Records

Game records

Biggest Wins (40+ Margin)

Biggest Losses (40+ Margin)

Attendance records
The largest home attendances for NSW in State of Origin are:

 Sydney Cricket Ground (1982-1987) - 42,048 - Game 2, 1987
 Sydney Football Stadium (1988-1998) - 42,235 - Game 1, 1990
 Stadium Australia (1999–present) - 88,336 (Olympic Games configuration) - Game 2, 199983,813 (post reconfiguration) - Game 3, 2014

Overall

This is a list of records for New South Wales dating back to 1908 and includes traditional Interstate matches plus State of Origin records combined. Statistics from the Super League Tri-series are not included. There were no Interstate matches played between 1916–1918 and 1942–1944 due to the World Wars.

Individual Records

Most Capped (20+ Games)

Most Points (90+ Points)

Most Tries (15+ Tries)

Individual Scoring Records

Game Records

Biggest Wins (40+ Margin)

Biggest Losses (40+ Margin)

References

Australian records
Rugby league records and statistics
Records